TownePlace Suites is a brand operated by Marriott International. The chain is part of the mid-tier extended stay lodging segment of the hospitality industry and consists of all-suites hotels. As of year-end 2018, TownePlace Suites operated 433 hotels in the United States and Canada with 43,953 rooms in addition to 223 hotels with 22,467 rooms in the pipeline.

History
The TownePlace Suites brand was first used in 1997 in Newport News, Virginia. By 2002, Marriott International had expanded the use of the brand to 100 locations, making it the company's fastest-growing brand. In 2006, the lobbies and suites of TownePlace Suites were redesigned.

Accommodations

Historical

From 2015

References

External links
 TownePlace Suites Website

Hotels established in 1997
Marriott International brands
Extended stay hotel chains